Daiyū Tatsumi (born 27 May 1940 as Tatsumi Yanagida) is a former sumo wrestler from Ōnejime, Kagoshima, Japan. He made his professional debut in May 1956 and reached the top division in May 1963. His highest rank was maegashira 1. Upon retirement from active competition he became an elder in the Japan Sumo Association under the name Kabutoyama, coaching at Izutsu stable. In 1989 he branched out from Izutsu and started up Kabutoyama stable, which he ran until it folded in December 2002. He became a coach at Minato stable, and worked there until he reached the Sumo Association's mandatory retirement age of 65.

Career record
The Kyushu tournament was first held in 1957, and the Nagoya tournament in 1958.

See also
Glossary of sumo terms
List of past sumo wrestlers
List of sumo tournament second division champions

References

1940 births
Living people
Japanese sumo wrestlers
Sumo people from Kagoshima Prefecture